Saint-Méloir-des-Ondes is a commune in the Ille-et-Vilaine department in Brittany in northwestern France. It is located near Saint-Malo.

The parish was named after St Melor a Breton and Cornish saint, by the monks of Mont Saint-Michel, who established a priory there in the early 11th century.

Population
Inhabitants of Saint-Méloir-des-Ondes are called méloriens in French.

See also
Communes of the Ille-et-Vilaine department

References

External links

 Cultural Heritage 
Mayors of Ille-et-Vilaine Association 

Communes of Ille-et-Vilaine